Meshir 22 - Coptic Calendar - Meshir 24

The twenty-third day of the Coptic month of Meshir, the sixth month of the Coptic year. In common years, this day corresponds to February 17, of the Julian Calendar, and March 2, of the Gregorian Calendar. This day falls in the Coptic Season of Shemu, the season of the Harvest.

Commemorations

Martyrs 

 The martyrdom of Saint Eusebius, son of Basilides the Vizier

References 

Days of the Coptic calendar